Nina Stanisavljević (born 17 May 2004) is a Serbian swimmer. She competed in the women's 50 metre freestyle event at the 2020 European Aquatics Championships, in Budapest, Hungary.

References

External links
 

2004 births
Living people
Serbian female swimmers
Serbian female freestyle swimmers
Place of birth missing (living people)
21st-century Serbian women
Mediterranean Games medalists in swimming
Mediterranean Games gold medalists for Serbia
Swimmers at the 2022 Mediterranean Games